Aaron Fletcher Stevens (August 9, 1819 – May 10, 1887) was a Union Army officer during the American Civil War and a two-term U.S. Congressman.

Birth and early years 
Stevens was born in Londonderry, New Hampshire on August 9, 1819. He spent his childhood in both Londonderry and also nearby Peterborough and attended Pinkerton Academy. He was a machinist, lawyer and state legislator before the Civil War. In 1845, he was admitted to the New Hampshire Bar, and helped found the New Hampshire Republican Party in the mid-1850s.

Civil War 
When the Civil War began he joined the 1st New Hampshire Volunteer Infantry as a major. He was mustered out of the volunteers on August 9, 1861. He rejoined the Union Army on September 23, 1862 as colonel of the new 13th New Hampshire Infantry Regiment. He and the regiment participated in the disastrous attack against Marye's Heights in the Battle of Fredericksburg.

Stevens commanded Brigade 1, Division 1, IX Corps (Union Army), Department of Virginia, January – February, 1863 and Brigade 3, Division 1, XVIII Corps (Union Army), Army of the James, from July 31, 1864 to September 29, 1864. Stevens was wounded at the Battle of Fort Harrison on September 29, 1864.

On December 12, 1864, President Abraham Lincoln nominated Stevens for appointment to the grade of brevet brigadier general of volunteers, to rank from December 8, 1864, and the United States Senate confirmed the appointment on March 10, 1865. Stevens was mustered out of the volunteers on June 29, 1865.

Stevens served two terms in the United States House of Representatives, March 4, 1867 – March 3, 1871.
 
Aaron Fletcher Stevens died at Nashua, May 10, 1887. He was buried at Universalist Church Cemetery, Nashua, New Hamphshire.

See also 

List of American Civil War brevet generals (Union)

Notes

References 
 Eicher, John H., and David J. Eicher, Civil War High Commands. Stanford: Stanford University Press, 2001. .
 Hunt, Roger D. and Jack R. Brown, Brevet Brigadier Generals in Blue. Gaithersburg, MD: Olde Soldier Books, Inc., 1990. .

External links 
General Aaron Fletcher Stevens In the Collections of the New Hampshire State House & State Library
Library of Congress Bio

1819 births
1887 deaths
19th-century American politicians
Union Army colonels
People of New Hampshire in the American Civil War
People from Derry, New Hampshire
New Hampshire lawyers
Republican Party members of the United States House of Representatives from New Hampshire
People from Peterborough, New Hampshire
Pinkerton Academy alumni
19th-century American lawyers